Piešťany Airport  is an airport serving spa town of Piešťany, Slovakia. Airport is used for music festivals during the summer and is home to the Military History Museum Piešťany

Airlines and Destinations
The following airlines operate regular scheduled and charter flights at Piešťany Airport:

Statistics

References

External links

Airports in Slovakia